Bashir Ahmad Saadat (born December 27, 1981) is an Afghan football player. He plays as a defender and has played football with Maiwand Kabul FC since 2000. Bashir is considered one of Afghanistan's best players. 

Saadat has made sixteen appearances for Afghanistan national football team, including two qualifying matches for the 2010 FIFA World Cup.

National team statistics

References

External links

1981 births
Living people
Afghan footballers
Footballers from Kabul
Footballers at the 2002 Asian Games

Association football defenders
Asian Games competitors for Afghanistan
Afghanistan international footballers